Mustafa Hussein  (born 8 January 1984) is an Egyptian male handball player. He was a member of the Egypt men's national handball team, playing as a right wing. He was a part of the Egyptian squad at the 2008 Summer Olympics. On club level, he played for Al Ahly in Egypt.

References

1984 births
Living people
Egyptian male handball players
Handball players at the 2008 Summer Olympics
Olympic handball players of Egypt
Place of birth missing (living people)
21st-century Egyptian people